Ronald Jack Wright (April 8, 1953 – February 7, 2021) was an American politician who served as the U.S. representative for Texas's 6th congressional district from 2019 until his death in 2021. He was a member of the Republican Party.

After serving on Arlington's city council and as tax assessor-collector for Tarrant County, Wright was elected to the House of Representatives in 2018 and reelected in 2020. Before his death from COVID-19 on February 7, 2021, Wright had been diagnosed with lung cancer in June 2019.

Early life and education 
Ronald Jack Wright was born on April 8, 1953, in Jacksonville, Texas, the son of Peggy Darlene (Powar) and George Willis Wright. He grew up in Azle, Texas, graduating from Azle High School in 1971. He then attended the University of Texas at Arlington for two years, studying history, psychology, and political science.

Career 
Before entering politics Wright worked at Ceramic Cooling Tower, Inc. He wrote several op-eds for the Fort Worth Star-Telegram in the 1990s, recommending public executions and display of corpses as a deterrent to crimes.

Wright served on the Arlington City Council from 2000 to 2008 and as Mayor Pro-Tem of Arlington from 2004 to 2008. He then served as district director for Congressman Joe Barton from 2000 to 2009. From 2009 to 2011, Wright was Barton's Chief of Staff. Wright was appointed Tarrant County Tax Assessor-Collector in 2011, serving until 2018.

In 2014, Wright's office added the motto "In God We Trust" to its stationery, including tax assessment envelopes and tax statements.

U.S. House of Representatives

Elections

2018 

Wright finished in first place in the primary election, but did not achieve the 50% majority required to avoid a runoff. He faced Jake Ellzey in the runoff election, and won with 52% of the vote. In the general election, Wright defeated Democrat Jana Lynne Sanchez.

2020 

Wright was reelected in 2020, defeating attorney Stephen Daniel. His death triggered a special election in 2021.

Tenure
In June 2019, Reproaction, an abortion rights advocacy group, released a video that showed Wright stating women should "absolutely" be punished for performing self-managed abortions, as "they committed murder".

In December 2020, Wright was one of 126 Republican members of the House of Representatives to sign an amicus brief in support of Texas v. Pennsylvania, a lawsuit filed at the United States Supreme Court contesting the results of the 2020 presidential election, in which Joe Biden defeated incumbent Donald Trump. The Supreme Court declined to hear the case on the basis that Texas lacked standing under Article III of the Constitution to challenge the results of an election held by another state. Wright later voted against certifying Arizona's and Pennsylvania's electoral votes in an effort to deny the final mechanism that would legally certify Biden's victory. Both votes occurred after the storming of the United States Capitol.

Committee assignments 
Committee on Foreign Affairs
Subcommittee on Africa, Global Health, Global Human Rights and International Organizations
Subcommittee on Europe, Eurasia, Energy, and the Environment
Committee on Education and Labor
Subcommittee on Health, Employment, Labor, and Pensions
Subcommittee on Workforce Protections

Caucus memberships 
 Freedom Caucus

Health issues and death
In July 2019, Wright announced he had been diagnosed with lung cancer. The next year, a series of complications with his radiation treatment led to his hospitalization.

On January 21, 2021, Wright announced he had tested positive for COVID-19. After he and his wife were hospitalized in Dallas for two weeks, Wright died from the virus on February 7. As a result, he became the first sitting member of Congress to die from the disease.

Lawmakers from both parties eulogized Wright after his death. Sanchez, his Democratic opponent in 2018, said that while she had her differences with Wright, "we both ran for Congress for the same reason: to fight for the people of North Texas. He served with passion while battling cancer and a deadly virus that has claimed far too many lives far too soon."

Personal life

Wright was married to Susan Wright, whom he met in June 2000 at the Texas GOP convention in Houston. She was a committeewoman for the Texas State Republican Executive Committee (SREC) for District 10. On February 24, 2021, she announced her candidacy in the special election to fill her husband's congressional seat. She was endorsed by former President Donald Trump and placed first in the May 1, 2021, primary, but did not receive 50% of the vote. Consequently, under Texas law, she advanced to a runoff against the second-place finisher, Republican State Representative Jake Ellzey of Waxahachie. On June 27, 2021, she lost the runoff to Ellzey. Wright was a Roman Catholic.

Electoral history

2018

2020

See also

 List of United States Congress members who died in office
 Luke Letlow, U.S. Representative–elect from Louisiana who died from COVID-19

References

External links

1953 births
2021 deaths
20th-century American businesspeople
21st-century American politicians
American construction businesspeople
Businesspeople from Texas
Catholics from Texas
Catholic politicians from Texas
County officials in Texas
Deaths from lung cancer in Texas
Deaths from the COVID-19 pandemic in Texas
People from Arlington, Texas
People from Azle, Texas
People from Jacksonville, Texas
Political chiefs of staff
Republican Party members of the United States House of Representatives from Texas
Texas city council members
United States congressional aides